Joe Henderson (1937–2001) was an American jazz saxophonist.

Joe Henderson may also refer to:

Joe "Mr Piano" Henderson (1920–1980), British pianist
Joe Henderson (gospel singer) (1937–1964), gospel singer
Joe Henderson (runner) (born 1943), American runner, running coach, and fitness writer
Joe Henderson (baseball) (born 1946), MLB player
Joe Henderson (footballer, born 1924) (1924–1984), Scottish football player
Joe Henderson (footballer, born 1993), English football player
Lofton R. Henderson (1903–1942), U.S. Marine Corps naval aviator nicknamed Joe
Joe Henderson (gridiron football) (born 1986), gridiron football linebacker

See also
Joseph Henderson (disambiguation)